LabKey Server is a software suite available for scientists to integrate, analyze, and share biomedical research data. The platform provides a secure data repository that allows web-based querying, reporting, and collaborating across a range of data sources. Specific scientific applications and workflows can be added on top of the basic platform and leverage a data processing pipeline.

License

LabKey licenses LabKey Server and its documentation for free under the Apache License.

Languages and extensibility

The base platform is written in Java.  It can be extended through the addition of Java-based modules or simple, file-based modules written in HTML, XML and JavaScript.  The platform can also be extended using LabKey Server's Java, JavaScript, R, Python, Perl and SAS client libraries.

History

LabKey Server, originally known as the Computational Proteomics Analysis System (CPAS), was developed at the Fred Hutchinson Cancer Research Center to manage high volumes of data generated at the Fred Hutch Computational Proteomics Lab. In 2005, a small team spun out of the Hutch and began operating independently as LabKey Software after contributors realized that the software could be beneficial to the broader scientific community.

Core Components

LabKey Server provides a secure data repository for all types of biomedical data, including mass spectrometry, flow cytometry, microarray, microplate, ELISpot, ELISA, NAb and observational study information.  A customizable data processing pipeline allows the upload and processing of the large data files common in biomedical research.

The platform also provides domain-specific support for several areas of research, including:
 Observational Studies. Supports management of longitudinal, large-scale studies of participants, subjects or animals over time. Allows the integration of clinical data with assay results.
 Proteomics.  Allows the processing of high-throughput mass spectrometry data using tools such as the X! Tandem search engine, the Trans-Proteomic Pipeline, Mascot and Sequest.  Certified as "Silver-Level Compliant Data Service" with the caBIG standard.
 Flow Cytometry. Supports automated quality control, centralized data management and web-based data sharing. Integrates with FlowJo.

Zika Open Research Portal

In 2016, LabKey and Professor Dave O'Connor of the University of Wisconsin–Madison launched the Zika Open Research Portal  using LabKey Server. The portal provides direct access to experiment data being produced by members of the Zika Experimental Science Team (ZEST). The portal received attention from the scientific community for being the first platform of its kind to share real-time research data.

Open Source Software

Labkey is licensed in a variety of manners. Source-code is provided for a core set of features with the Community Edition, and there are also Premium Editions available.

Users

Users range from individual labs to large research consortia. In 2017, the program's users included the following:
 Cedars-Sinai Medical Center
 Center for HIV-AIDS Vaccine Immunology (CHAVI) at Duke University
 Collaboration for AIDS Vaccine Discovery (CAVD), funded by the Gates Foundation
 Fred Hutchinson Cancer Research Center
 Genomics England
 International AIDS Vaccine Initiative (IAVI)
 Infectious Disease Research Institute (IDRI)
 Institute of Molecular and Cell Biology (Singapore)
 Just Biotherapeutics
 NIMML
 Oregon National Primate Research Center
 Harvard Partners
 Statistical Center for HIV/AIDS Research and Prevention (SCHARP)
 Southwest National Primate Research Center
 University of Washington
 University of Michigan
 University of Kentucky
 University of South Florida
 University of Wisconsin
 Tulane National Primate Research Center
 Wisconsin National Primate Research Center

Publications

References

External links
 LabKey. The official web site for LabKey. Learn about products, features, and professional customization.
 LabKey Support Portal. Find support including documentation and community forums.

Free bioinformatics software
Mass spectrometry software
Proteomics
Science software for Windows
Science software for Linux
Science software for macOS